Jones Pass may be one of the following:

Mountain Passes
Jones Pass (Banff National Park) – a pass in Banff National Park, Alberta, Canada
Jones Pass (Willmore Wilderness Park) – a pass in Willmore Wilderness Park, Alberta, Canada
Jones Pass (Alaska) – a pass in Yukon-Koyukuk Census Area, Alaska, United States
Jones Pass (Colorado) – a pass between Clear Creek County and Grand County, Colorado, United States
Jones Pass (Wyoming) – a pass in Yellowstone National Park, Wyoming, United States